Cicindela depressula, the dispirited tiger beetle, is a species of flashy tiger beetle in the family Carabidae. It is found in North America.

Subspecies
Two subspecies have been described:
 Cicindela depressula depressula Casey, 1897, the Dispirited Tiger Beetle, is found in mountain ranges from southern Alaska south to the Sierra Nevada in east-central California and western Nevada; it is also found in the Rocky Mountains in southeastern British Columbia, northern Idaho, and western Montana.
 Cicindela depressula eureka Fall, 1901, the Eureka Tiger Beetle, is found in a narrow area in proximity of the Pacific Coast from northern Washington State to northern California.

References

Further reading

 Arnett, R.H. Jr., and M. C. Thomas. (eds.). (2000). American Beetles, Volume I: Archostemata, Myxophaga, Adephaga, Polyphaga: Staphyliniformia. CRC Press LLC, Boca Raton, FL.
 Arnett, Ross H. (2000). American Insects: A Handbook of the Insects of America North of Mexico. CRC Press.
 Freitag, Richard (1999). Catalogue of the tiger beetles of Canada and the United States, vii + 195.
 Richard E. White. (1983). Peterson Field Guides: Beetles. Houghton Mifflin Company.
 Riley K, Browne R (2011). "Changes in ground beetle diversity and community composition in age structured forests (Coleoptera, Carabidae)". ZooKeys 147: 601–621.

depressula
Beetles described in 1897